Baksheyevo is a rural locality (a selo) in Slednevskoye Rural Settlement, Alexandrovsky District, Vladimir Oblast, Russia. The population was 464 as of 2010. There are 11 streets.

Geography 
Baksheyevo is located 9 km north of Alexandrov (the district's administrative centre) by road. Stepanikha is the nearest rural locality.

References 

Rural localities in Alexandrovsky District, Vladimir Oblast
Alexandrovsky Uyezd (Vladimir Governorate)